LA Game Space was a nonprofit organization focused on experimental game design, research and education. The crowdfunded project planned to open an exhibition space in Los Angeles, along with a research wing, a space for workshops and support for artists in residence. The organization exceeded its crowdfunding target in 2012, but closed down in 2018 having failed to open a physical venue.

History

Founding
The project originated in November 2009, with the founders spending three years planning and organizing collaborators and events.

Kickstarter & experimental games
The venture was funded via a Kickstarter that asked for $250,000 and ultimately received $335,657 of funding. Adventure Time creator Pendleton Ward released a short animation to spread awareness of the project. Backers received access to 23 experimental games published by the organization, including works by Canabalt creator Adam Saltsman, Katamari creator Keita Takahashi and Kentucky Route Zero developer Tamas Kemenczy. Most of these were designed for the purpose of promoting the project, a notable exception being To My Favourite Sinner (2009) from Molleindustria. The pack was released on September 7, 2013, with several games being added shortly after the main launch. The collection was the only pack of games ever released by the organization.

Activities
LA Game Space obtained 501(c)(3) status after the conclusion of the Kickstarter campaign. A warehouse was leased and renovated but never opened for the intended purpose, with LA Game Space organizing events at external venues during this time, such as the Ace Hotel Los Angeles. The organization ceased operation in 2018, with a former board member blaming financial mismanagement.

Games published
All of these were published as part of Experimental Game Pack 01. The pack was originally released on September 7, 2013, though some games were added to the set shortly after that date. While the pack was advertised as containing 30 games, 23 were ultimately released, 21 of which were available for Windows, 19 for Mac and 14 for Linux. Since 2018 the Windows versions have been freely available via the Internet Archive, with the Mac versions joining in 2019. Some of the titles have since seen re-releases.

A further 9 games were in development and earmarked for the game pack but not released.

References

Non-profit organizations based in Los Angeles
Kickstarter projects